Andrei "Knyaz" Knyazev is a Russian rock musician, songwriter and singer. Leader of the Saint-Petersburg band Knyazz. From 1989 to 2011, the second vocalist and author of most of the lyrics of the band Korol i Shut.

Discography

With Korol i Shut:

Solo albums:

2005 – Scoundrel's Love ("Любовь негодяя")

With Knyazz:

See also

Mikhail Gorsheniov

References

Russian punk rock musicians
Russian rock singers
Musicians from Saint Petersburg
Singers from Saint Petersburg
1973 births
Living people
21st-century Russian singers
21st-century Russian male singers